Nudurupati Venkanna was a Telugu and Sanskrit poet from the Pudukkottai kingdom. He is known for the creation of the Telugu lexicon Andhra Bhasharnavamu and the Tondaman Vamsavali, a detailed chronicle of the Pudukkottai kingdom.

Life 

Venkanna was born in the distinguished Telugu-speaking Nudurupati family of Pudukkottai. His father Sitharamaiah was also a poet and bore the title Uddanda Kavi.

Literary works 

Venkanna's important works are Andhra Bhasharnavamu, Parvathi Kalyanamu, Raghunathivamu, Mallupuranamu, Brhannayika Dandakamu and Tondaman Vamsavali.

Andhra Bhasharnavamu is a comprehensive Telugu lexicon which is popular in the Tamil as well as Telugu country. It is composed of a total of 3 parts and is the biggest Telugu lexicon ever written. His Raghunathivamu is a Sanskrit work on Alankaras and dedicated to Venkanna's contemporary and patron Raghunatha Raya Tondaiman. Parvathi Kalyanamu is a Yakshagana on the marriage of Shiva and Parvathi while Mallupuranamu is a Telugu work on the Malla community, the only one of its kind. Brhannayika Dandakamu is a Telugu poem on Raghunatha Raya Tondaiman and is considered to be Venkanna's best composition.

Tondaman Vamsavali 

The literary work for which Venkanna is most popular in the Tondaman Vamsavali, a 333 line poem on the history of the Tondaiman dynasty of Pudukkottai. Published in 1914, the vamsavali is considered to be the most comprehensive source of history on Pudukkottai.

References 

 

Year of birth missing
Year of death missing
Telugu poets
Sanskrit poets
People from Pudukkottai district
Indian male poets
Poets from Tamil Nadu